Barbus haasi, or the "Catalonian barbel" (or barbo de cola roja), is a species of freshwater fish in the  family Cyprinidae.

It is a small size barbel found only in the northeast of the Iberian peninsula. Morphologically it is similar to Barbus bocagei, but it is smaller and rarely reaches sizes longer than 20 cm.

Its natural habitats are rivers and inland karsts in all Ebro basin, but mainly in inner Catalonia, especially in the Bages comarca area.

The species is threatened by habitat loss and the introduction of non-native species such as the pumpkinseed (Lepomis gibbosus) and the Wels catfish (Silurus Glanis).

See also
 Luciobarbus bocagei, a more common and abundant related species.

References

External links
 Picture

haasi
Cyprinid fish of Europe
Endemic fish of the Iberian Peninsula
Fish described in 1925
Taxonomy articles created by Polbot